The Ford-Van Auken 1909 Monoplane was the first of a series of aircraft built with and for the Ford Motor Company.

Design and development
The Monoplane's design was started in 1908 by Charles Van Auken using plans of a Blériot XI as a guide. A Ford Model T engine with holes bored throughout to lighten the weight was used as a powerplant. The aircraft was a conventional landing gear-equipped, wire braced, mid-wing monoplane with a fabric covered cruciform empennage and warping wings for roll control. The aircraft bore a striking resemblance to the Blériot XI.

Operational history
In 1909, the aircraft was test flown by Van Auken in Dearborn Michigan, flying in ground effect before crashing into a fence. The engine was modified for more power and the aircraft was flown a second time in 1910 at the Fort Wayne parade grounds; after becoming airborne, Van Auken lost control and crashed into a tree.

Specifications (1909 Monoplane)

References

Mid-wing aircraft
Ford aircraft
Single-engined tractor aircraft
Aircraft first flown in 1909